The Civil Contingencies Act 2004 (c. 36) is an Act of the Parliament of the United Kingdom that makes provision about civil contingencies. It also replaces former Civil Defence and Emergency Powers legislation of the 20th century.

Background to the Act
The Civil Contingencies Act 2004 repeals the Civil Defence Act 1948 and the Civil Defence Act (Northern Ireland) 1950. Part 1 of the Act establishes a new and broad definition of "emergency". The definition includes war or attack by a foreign power, which were defined as emergencies under previous legislation, as well as terrorism which poses a threat of serious damage to the security of the United Kingdom and events which threaten serious damage to human welfare in a place in the United Kingdom or to the environment of a place in the United Kingdom. Previous legislation, which was enacted during or after the Second World War, provided for civil protection solely in terms of "civil defence", which was defined as "measures, other than actual combat, for affording defence against a hostile attack by a foreign power". The Act also broadens the number of local bodies which have duties in the event of an emergency; previous legislation only related to local authorities, police authorities and certain fire authorities. Neither strand had seen any significant amendments in a number of years and they were not deemed able to cope in the event of domestic threats to services such as the fuel protests of 2000 or natural threats like the mass flooding in 2000 and the outbreak of foot and mouth disease in 2001.
	 		 	
In the wake of these three events, the Deputy Prime Minister, John Prescott, announced a formal review into emergency planning arrangements. The review included a public consultation exercise, which generally supported the Government's conclusion that existing legislation was no longer adequate and that new legislation was required. A draft Bill was scrutinised in detail by the Joint Committee on the Draft Civil Contingencies Bill, which was very influential in shaping the legislation though several of its proposals (notably creation of a new agency) were rejected.

The Act guides and authorises the creation of a Local Resilience Forum to consider such matters within an existing police force boundary and requires responders to undertake risk assessments, maintain them in a Community Risk Register and to publish this register. Risks in this context are those that could result in a major emergency. This Community Risk Register is the first step in the emergency planning process; it ensures that the plans that are developed are proportionate to the risk.

The Act

The Act is divided into three parts:
 Part 1 defines the obligations certain organisations to prepare for various types of emergencies.
 Part 2 provides additional powers for the government to use in the event of a large scale emergency.
 Part 3 provides supplementary legislation in support of the first two parts.

Part 1: Local arrangements for civil protection

Part 1 of the Act places a legal obligation upon emergency services and local authorities (defined as "Category 1 responders" under the Act) to assess the risk of, plan, and exercise for emergencies, as well as undertaking Business Continuity Management. Category 1 responders are also responsible for warning and informing the public in relation to emergencies.  Finally, local authorities are required to provide business continuity advice to local businesses. It also places legal obligations for increased co-operation and information sharing between different emergency services and also to non-emergency services that might have a role in an emergency such as electric companies (non-emergency services are defined as Category 2 responders under the Act).

Part 2: Emergency powers

The second part of the Act provides that temporary emergency regulations are normally made through Order in Council or by a Minister of the Crown if arranging for an Order in Council would not be possible without serious delay. Such regulations are limited in duration to 30 days, unless Parliament votes to extend this period before it expires. The only primary legislation which may not be amended by emergency regulations is the Human Rights Act 1998 and Part 2 of the Civil Contingencies Act itself. There was an attempt by Conservative and Liberal Democrat peers to add a number of other key constitutional laws to the exemption list during the Bill stage, but this was unsuccessful. They tried to protect these laws from emergency regulation:

 Habeas Corpus Act 1679 
 Bill of Rights 1689 
 The clause in the Parliament Act 1911 that limits the duration of a Parliament to five years
 Act of Settlement 1701 
 House of Commons Disqualification Act 1975 
 Life Peerages Act 1958 
 House of Lords Act 1999

The introduction of the Act comes with increased funding for emergency planning in the United Kingdom to help organisations comply with the Act and brings emergency planning funding more on par with European levels.

Category 1 and 2 responders

Category 1 and 2 responders are organisations defined in the Act as having responsibilities for carrying out the legislation.

Each responder has an emergency planning officer (sometimes called a civil protection officer, civil contingencies officer, resilience officer, or risk manager) who is usually responsible for ensuring their organisation is in compliance with the Act and sharing information with other responders. The usual way of checking compliance is by regularly testing plans by reviews or exercises.

Category 1 responders

Category 1 responders are known as core responders; they include the usual "blue-light" emergency services, as well as others:

 Local authorities
 Police forces, including the British Transport Police
 Fire services
 Ambulance services
 HM Coastguard
 NHS hospital trusts, NHS foundation trusts (and Welsh equivalents), NHS England, Public Health England, and Public Health Wales
 Port health authorities
 The Environment Agency, the Scottish Environment Protection Agency, and Natural Resources Wales

Category 2 responders

Category 2 responders are key co-operating responders that act in support of the Category 1 responders. Category 2 responders are mostly utility companies and transport organisations:

Utilities
 Electricity distributors and transmitters
 Gas distributors 
 Water and sewerage undertakers
 Telephone service providers (fixed and mobile)

Transport
 Network Rail
 Train operating companies (passenger and freight)
 London Underground
 Transport for London
 Highways England
 Airport operators 
 Harbour authorities

Others

 The Health and Safety Executive

Section 34 – Commencement
The following orders have been made under sections 34(1) and (3):
The Civil Contingencies Act 2004 (Commencement No. 1) Order 2004 (S.I. 2004/3281 (C. 148))
The Civil Contingencies Act 2004 (Commencement No. 2) Order 2005 (S.I. 2005/772 (C. 33))
The Civil Contingencies Act 2004 (Commencement No. 3) Order 2005 (S.I. 2005/2040 (C. 89))
The Civil Contingencies Act 2004 (Commencement) (Scotland) Order 2005 (S.S.I. 2005/493 (C. 26)), made under sections 34(2) and (3).

Reactions 

According to the leading commentary on the Act, by Clive Walker and James Broderick:
The Government’s handling of risks and emergencies in recent years has failed to inspire public confidence. In a range of crises, from the Foot and Mouth outbreak through to the grounds for war in Iraq, official predictions or capabilities have been found wanting. The Civil Contingencies Act 2004 tenders reassurance by the promise of systemic planning and activity in civil resilience, though defence lies beyond its scope. The wide-ranging powers in the Act have the capability of delivering on the promise. But, as shall be revealed in this book, efforts will be hampered because the legislation is hesitant and uneven.

A more critical view is taken by Henry Porter in his 2009 novel The Dying Light, which describes a conspiracy to subvert democracy, based on the modern state's capacity to collect and cross-refer personal information.  The Afterword to the novel asserts that the Civil Contingencies Act 2004 "enables the Prime Minister, a minister, or the Government Chief Whip to dismantle democracy and the Rule of Law overnight...on the mere conviction that an emergency is about to take place".

See also
Emergency planning in Wales

References

External links 
  The official site for all issues and current news to do with the CCA.
 
 Lords Hansard Text for 16 November 2004

Emergency laws
United Kingdom Acts of Parliament 2004
Constitutional laws of the United Kingdom
Emergency management in the United Kingdom
Emergency laws in the United Kingdom